Hamidgu (also Romanized as Ḩamīdgū) is a village in Jahliyan Rural District, in the Central District of Konarak County, Sistan and Baluchestan Province, Iran. At the 2006 census, its population was 840, in 155 families.

References 

Populated places in Konarak County